Neuroepithelial cell-transforming gene 1 protein is a protein that in humans is encoded by the NET1 gene.

References

Further reading

External links
 
 
 PDBe-KB provides an overview of all the structure information available in the PDB for Human Neuroepithelial cell-transforming gene 1 protein (NET1)

Human proteins